The Estonian Sports and Olympic Museum (Estonian: Eesti Spordi- ja Olümpiamuuseum), founded in 1963 and modernized in 2020, is the largest sports museum in the Baltic states. The museum is located on Rüütli street in Tartu, Estonia. Before 2016, Estonian Sports and Olympic Museum was named Estonian Sports Museum.

Description 

Sports Museum was re-opened in October 2020 with a brand new permanent exhibition "The Story of Estonian Sport", Estonian Sports Hall of Fame and various hands-on activities like rally simulator, reaction wall, retro room, interactive basketball court, historical gym and many other fun attractions. The museum consists of exhibition rooms on three floors, historic cellar and specialized library. The museum contains collections of historic awards, cups and sports equipment.

With the renovation Estonian Sports and Olympic Museum opened also new permanent exhibition „The Story of Estonian Sport“ takes you on a trip across the history of sports in Estonia. It tells you a story of a speck of land and colossal wins. It tells a story of the glitter of gold medals but also of the dark shadows of foul play.

The most spectacular part of the new exhibition is the totally new Estonian Sports Hall of Fame. Here the visitors can see some never-before publicly seen footage of 50 of the greatest Estonian athletes and sports personalities of the last century. Each of the Hall of Famer's gets a special recognition in this room with an honorary plate, highlight reel of their career and an overview of their greatest achievements. Estonian Sports Hall of Fame was created in 2020 with the first 50 members being chosen from personas whose career ended before 2000. Starting from 2021 new members will be added yearly.

The museum is close to the river Emajõgi, the main building of Tartu University and the botanical gardens.  On the opposite side of the street is a notable secondary school (Hugo Treffner Gymnasium).

References

External links 

 

Museums in Tartu
1963 establishments in Estonia
Museums established in 1963
Sports culture in Estonia
Sports museums
Sport in Tartu
History of sport in Estonia